3x3 basketball at the 2009 Asian Youth Games
 3x3 basketball at the 2013 Asian Youth Games
 3x3 basketball at the 2025 Asian Youth Games (future event)

Asian Youth Games
Basketball at the Asian Youth Games